Sangla Hill Junction railway station is located in the Sangla Hill town, in Nankana Sahib Tehsil of Sheikhupura District, Punjab province, Pakistan. The station serves as a major junction between the Shahdara Bagh–Sangla Hill Branch Line, Khanewal–Wazirabad Branch Line and Sangla Hill–Kundian Branch Line.

Facilities 
There are no facilities available in Sangla Hill Junction like other junctions of Pakistan Railway.

Services 
The routes are Sangla Hill from linked to Karachi, Lahore, Rawalpindi, Hafizabad, Alipur Chatta, Wazirabad Jn, Gujrat, Lala Musa Jn, Jhelum, Multan, Faisalabad, Gojra, Toba Tek Singh, Shorkot Cantt Jn, Hyderabad, Bahawalpur, Rohri and Nawabshah  Major trains that stop here are Pakistan Express runs between Karachi and Rawalpindi and the other one is Akbar Express runs between Lahore and Quetta. In Past, Rail Car Express, Abaseen Express, Chiltan Express, Shaheen Express also stopped here but now these trains are not operating for a long time.

See also
 List of railway stations in Pakistan
 Pakistan Railways

References

External links

Railway stations in Nankana Sahib District
Railway stations on Sangla Hill–Kundian Branch Line
Railway stations on Khanewal–Wazirabad Line
Railway stations on Shahdara Bagh–Sangla Hill Branch Line